He Chunlin (born August 1933) is a Chinese politician who served as secretary-general of the National People's Congress from 1998 to 2003, director of the National People's Congress Supervisory and Judicial Affairs Committee and director of the Credentials Committee of the National People's Congress from 2003 to 2008.

He was a member of the Standing Committee of the 9th and 10th National People's Congress. He was a member of the 14th and 15th Central Committee of the Chinese Communist Party.

Biography
He was born in Wuxi County, Jiangsu, in August 1933. He joined the Chinese Communist Party (CCP) in March 1951. He graduated from Northeast Agricultural University. Starting in 1957, he successively served as technician, engineer, deputy section chief, and section chief of the Agricultural Mechanization Research Institute of the Chinese Academy of Agricultural Sciences, interspersed with two years in May Seventh Cadre Schools in Yilan County, Heilongjiang and then Changde, Hunan from 1968 to 1970. 

He was deputy director of Science and Technology Department of the Agricultural Mechanization Research Institute of the First Ministry of Machine Building in 1972, and held that office until 1978. After his short term as deputy head of the Research Group of the Office of the Leading Group for Agricultural Mechanization of the State Council, he was appointed  in 1979, and one year later became head of the General Office and director of Research Room. In 1982, he was despatched to the State Council, becoming head of Special Zone Working Group of the General Office in 1982 and director of the Office of Special Economic Zones in 1984. He also served as deputy secretary-general of the State Council from May 1988 to March 1998. In March 1998, he was chosen as secretary-general of the National People's Congress, he remained in that position until March 2003, when he took office as director of the National People's Congress Supervisory and Judicial Affairs Committee. He also served as director of the Credentials Committee of the National People's Congress from April 2003 to April 2008.

References

1933 births
Living people
People from Wuxi
Northeast Agricultural University alumni
People's Republic of China politicians from Jiangsu
Chinese Communist Party politicians from Jiangsu
Members of the Standing Committee of the 9th National People's Congress
Members of the Standing Committee of the 10th National People's Congress
Members of the 14th Central Committee of the Chinese Communist Party
Members of the 15th Central Committee of the Chinese Communist Party